The ashy wood pigeon (Columba pulchricollis) is a species of bird in the family Columbidae, found in temperate forests of southeastern Asia.

Distribution
The ashy wood pigeon has a wide range throughout Southeast Asia, able to be found in Bhutan, northern India, southern Tibet, southern China, northern Laos, northern to mid Myanmar, northern Thailand, and Taiwan. While the world population is unknown, the Taiwan population is estimated to be anywhere from 10,000 to 100,000 breeding pairs.

Nesting
Clutches usually consist of one single white egg, although double egg clutches have been recorded. This pigeon incubates its eggs for approximately 21–23 days. Young birds fledge at about 28 days from being hatched.

References

External links
Pigeon Information & Resources

ashy wood pigeon
Birds of Nepal
Birds of Eastern Himalaya
Birds of Yunnan
Birds of Myanmar
Birds of Taiwan
ashy wood pigeon
Taxonomy articles created by Polbot
ashy wood pigeon